"Still Waters (Run Deep)" is a song by the Bee Gees, written by Barry, Robin, and Maurice Gibb. It was the third and final single issued from their 21st studio album, Still Waters (1997), on 27 October 1997. The recording and production of the song were assisted by Hugh Padgham. The song became the album's third top-20 UK single, peaking at  18 on the UK Singles Chart. It also reached No. 57 on the US Billboard Hot 100, their most recent appearance on that chart.

Critical reception
British magazine Music Week rated "Still Waters (Run Deep)" three out of five, adding, "The title track from the Gibb brothers' latest album is their usual pleasant, sumptuously-performed fare, but it doesn't have the strength to become a huge hit."

Music video
A music video was produced to promote the single, directed by Jake Nava. In the video, the Bee Gees are standing under and walking around road bridges in the city at night while two lovers, a woman and a man, find their way to love each other. The video ends with sunrise.

Versions
The single version was remixed with a more R&B/hip hop beat compared with the album version. A demo version was included on one of the UK CD singles.

Live performances
On 14 November 1997, the Bee Gees performed the song in Las Vegas for their One Night Only concert to promote the single.

Track listings
 UK CD single 1
 "Still Waters (Run Deep)" – 4:08
 "Still Waters (Run Deep)" (demo) – 3:55
 "Obsessions" – 4:43

 UK CD single 2
 "Still Waters (Run Deep)" – 4:08
 "Night Fever" – 3:29
 "More Than a Woman" – 3:16
 "You Should Be Dancing" – 4:16

 US CD single
 "Still Waters (Run Deep)" – 4:08
 "Love Never Dies" – 4:05

Charts

Release history

References

Bee Gees songs
1997 singles
1997 songs
Music videos directed by Jake Nava
Polydor Records singles
Song recordings produced by Hugh Padgham
Songs written by Barry Gibb
Songs written by Maurice Gibb
Songs written by Robin Gibb